Charles-François Baillargeon (April 26, 1798 – October 13, 1870) was a Canadian Roman Catholic priest and archbishop.

Biography
He was from Lower Canada and studied at the Collège de Saint-Pierre-de-la-Rivière-du-Sud and Collège de Nicolet followed by four years of theology at Quebec where his choice of the priesthood was confirmed. He was ordained in 1822, and became chaplain of the church of Saint-Roch and also the director of the college.

He then served as a parish priest and in 1831 was appointed by Bishop Bernard-Claude Panet to the cathedral as a parish priest. This was an extremely taxing assignment and he was also working on a French translation of the New Testament for Bishop Joseph-Octave Plessis.

He became Bishop Baillargeon in 1851 and archbishop in 1867. He continued to be active in his vocation until his death. Because he had not appointed a coadjutor, two priests, Charles-Félix Cazeau and Elzéar-Alexandre Taschereau, served as administrators for a period.

See also 

 Roman Catholic Archdiocese of Quebec

References

External links 
 Biography at the Dictionary of Canadian Biography Online
 the Catholic Encyclopedia

1798 births
1870 deaths
Roman Catholic archbishops of Quebec
19th-century Roman Catholic archbishops in Canada
Burials at the Cathedral-Basilica of Notre-Dame de Québec
Participants in the First Vatican Council